Beatrice Helg (born 1956) is a Swiss photographer.

Biography 

Béatrice Helg was born in Geneva, Switzerland in 1956. Firstly, she studied cello at the Geneva Music Conservatory. After that she studied photography at the California College of Arts and Crafts in Oakland as well as in Brooks Institute in Santa Barbara. She also studied photography at International Center of Photography in New York. Helg took part in the organization of La Fotografia in Venice 79 photography exhibition. Helg lives and works in Geneva. Béatrice Helg is known for fusion of still life photography with geometric abstraction as well as using industrial materials.

Exhibitions

Solo
1983 "Unnamed exhibition" Jane Corkin Gallery, Toronto, Canada
1983 "Stille Gesichter" Galerie für Fotografie, Stuttgart, Germany
1983 "Stille Gesichter" Galerie Zur Stockeregg, Zurich, Switzerland
1983 "Visages de Silence". Galerie Sonia Zannettacci, Geneva, Switzerland 
1994 "Architectonic Illusion", Southeast Museum of Photography, Daytona Beach, Florida.
2006 "Béatrice Helg – an accrochage", Museum Tinguely, Basel, Switzerland.
2012 "Risonanze", Museo Fortuny, Venice, Italy.
2014 "Résonances", Ditesheim & Maffei Fine Art SA, Neuchâtel, Switzerland 
2015 "Cosmos", Galerie Thessa Herold, Paris, France.
2015 "Cosmos", as part of "Paris Photo", Grand Palais, Paris, France.

Group
 The AIPAD Photography Show, Joel Soroka Gallery, The Park Avenue Armory, New York City, United States

Collections
Helg's works are part of public galleries and museum collections, including Museum of Fine Arts, Houston, Minneapolis Institute of Art, Albert H. Small Collection, National Gallery of Canada, George Eastman Museum, Institut Valencià d'Art Modern, Los Angeles County Museum of Art, Maison européenne de la photographie, Musée de l'Élysée, Museum Tinguely.

Bibliography

External links

References

20th-century Swiss photographers
Photographers from Geneva
1956 births
Living people
Date of birth missing (living people)
California College of the Arts alumni
Brooks Institute alumni
Swiss women photographers
21st-century Swiss photographers
20th-century women photographers
21st-century women photographers